James Carvin (July 25, 1929 – January 16, 2009) was a New Orleans political consultant with a sustained record of supporting winners in New Orleans mayoral elections. Using a wheelchair later in life, Carvin was eulogized as a "winner to the end" in the Times-Picayune by James Gill.

References

1929 births
2009 deaths
People from New Orleans
Louisiana Democrats
American agnostics
American politicians with disabilities